Duoyi Network, or Duoyi Games, is a Chinese video game company headquartered in Guangzhou, Guangdong. Founded in 2006 by Xu Youzhen, the company is known for developing some of China’s most acclaimed game franchises including the Shenwu series and the Dream World series. Their most recent projects include the third generation of the Shenwu series Shenwu 3, the cross-platform game for the Dream World franchise Dream World 3D, the 3D MMORPG Eternal Magic, the mobile turn-based RPG Legion of Knights, the multiplayer sandplay SLG Circle of War, and the sandbox RPG Portal Knights.

In 2015, Duoyi reached a net profit of USD 150 million with a 50% growth rate and ranked the 4th among Chinese game companies in iOS revenue. In 2016, the company kept the same level of performance and started IPO. Duoyi ranked 25th among the MIIT’s 2017 Top 100 Chinese Internet Enterprises, and 4th among all game companies in China.

History

Duoyi Network was founded by Xu Youzhen, one of China's most well-known game designers since the early 2000s. Before founding Duoyi Network, Xu was the main designer of Fantasy Westward Journey and responsible for the architecture of the core gameplay. He led the development of Dream World and Shenwu as the founder and president of Duoyi Network.

On September 24, 2007, Duoyi released its first PC title Dream World, a 2D turn-based MMORPG. In 2008, Duoyi received the Gold Finger Award from the China Cultural Industry Association for the creation of Dream World.

In 2010, Duoyi released Dream Emperor, a strategy mini-client game, and Shenwu, a turn-based MMORPG based on the story line of Journey to the West.

In 2011, Duoyi launched Tank Force!, an action mobile game that hit no.1 on the App Store Download Chart. In 2012, Duoyi ranked the 40th of “China’s Top 100 Internet Companies” jointly released by Internet Society of China and MIIT.

In 2015, Duoyi released Shenwu Mobile, which hit the first on App Store Grossing Chart in China and 9th globally. Shenwu Mobile remained a top 10 grossing app for over 80 consecutive weeks. Shenwu 2, a major expansion set for both Shenwu PC and Shenwu Mobile, was released on July 3, 2015. On March 19, 2016, Shenwu 2 received two Gold Finger Awards for Excellent Online Game and Excellent Mobile Game at the Chinese Game Industry Annual Conference. Shenwu 3, the second major expansion set for the Shenwu franchise, was released on December 24, 2017.

Dream World Mobile and Dream World 3D were released respectively in June 2015 and July 2017. In December 2017, the Dream World franchise announced its 10th Anniversary Event.

Duoyi established partnership with 505 Games for the exclusive right to operate Portal Knights, a survival action role-playing game, in China. Duoyi released Portal Knights in China on November 21, 2017.

In 2017, Duoyi Network ranked the 25th of “China’s Top 100 Internet Companies”, released by Internet Society of China and MIIT, and the 4th among game companies in China.

Games

Honors and awards

References 

Chinese companies established in 2006
Video game companies established in 2006
Video game companies of China
Video game development companies
Video game publishers